The Americans: The Democratic Experience is a 1973 book by American historian Daniel J. Boorstin. The book is the third in his American history trilogy, in which he argues that the physical environment of the New World shaped American society. 

In 1974 the book was awarded the Pulitzer Prize for History.

References 

1973 non-fiction books
English-language books
History books about the United States
Pulitzer Prize for History-winning works
Random House books